Growing Up X: A Memoir by the Daughter of Malcolm X is a 2002 book by Ilyasah Shabazz, the third daughter of Malcolm X and Betty Shabazz. Shabazz wrote the book with Kim McLarin.

In Growing Up X, Shabazz writes about what it was like to grow up in the shadow of her father, a human rights activist who was assassinated when she was two years old. She also writes about her mother and sisters, and her early life growing up, along with her personal memories and feelings about Malcolm X. Shabazz has commented that she was nervous about releasing the book, because she did not want to ruin people's expectations of her, but has received unexpectedly great praise for her writing.

Further reading

External links
Discussion on Growing Up X with Ilyasah Shabazz at the Library of Congress, June 19, 2002

2002 non-fiction books
African-American autobiographies
Collaborative non-fiction books
Works about Malcolm X